Prison 59 (in Persian: بازداشتگاه ۵۹) is an unofficial detention centre on Vali-e Asr Avenue in Tehran, Iran, under the administration of the Iranian Revolutionary Guard Corps. Like other covert detention centres such as Towhid Prison and Amaken, prisoners here are held without charge and subjected to solitary confinement.

See also

Evin Prison
Prison 209
Heshmatiyeh Prison
Gohardasht Prison
Towhid Prison

External links
Human Rights Watch report on illegal detention centers in Iran
ECOI human rights report about prison conditions in Iran

Buildings and structures in Tehran
Prisons in Iran
Human rights abuses in Iran